Patricio Caicedo Liciaga (6 February 1899 – 8 September 1981) was a Spanish football player and manager.

Career
Born in Bilbao, Caicedo played as a midfielder.

He managed Espanyol, Athletic Bilbao, Zaragoza, Mallorca, Real Murcia, Sevilla, Real Oviedo, Las Palmas, Hércules and Girona.

References

1899 births
1981 deaths
Spanish footballers
Association football midfielders
Spanish football managers
RCD Espanyol managers
Athletic Bilbao managers
Real Zaragoza managers
RCD Mallorca managers
Real Murcia managers
Sevilla FC managers
Real Oviedo managers
UD Las Palmas managers
Hércules CF managers
Girona FC managers
La Liga managers
Segunda División managers